The Exchange is a historic home located at La Plata, Charles County, Maryland, United States. It is a narrow, one-story, two-bay, gambrel-roofed frame house built about 1778, for a family of moderate economic means. Among its most notable features is its interior woodwork.  Also on the property is a small, late-18th century frame tobacco house, a 20th-century frame garage, well house, and a swimming pool.

The Exchange was listed on the National Register of Historic Places in 1984.

References

External links
, including photo from 1978, at Maryland Historical Trust

Houses in Charles County, Maryland
Houses on the National Register of Historic Places in Maryland
Houses completed in 1778
National Register of Historic Places in Charles County, Maryland